"" or "" ("Rise, countrymen" in Sranan Tongo) is the national anthem of Suriname. It has two verses: the first in Dutch and the second in Sranan Tongo.

History
The original version of the anthem was written by Cornelis Atses Hoekstra in 1893 and based on a 1876 melody by Johannes Corstianus de Puy. It was written to replace the old anthem "Wien Neêrlands Bloed". The anthem did not have an official status. In 1959, the Government of Suriname appointed Surinamese writer Henri Frans de Ziel to add a stanza about the unity of the country to Hoekstra's anthem. De Ziel was concerned about the negative nuance in the original and started to transform the anthem into a positive message. He combined this with a poem he wrote in Sranan Tongo on the death of Ronald Elwin Kappel. His anthem was unanimously approved by the Government of Suriname on 7 December 1959. De Ziel originally used a melody by Surinamese composer Johannes Helstone, however the government preferred the original 1876 melody.

Lyrics

Notes

References

External links

 MP3 version

South American anthems
Surinamese music
National symbols of Suriname
National anthems
Dutch-language songs
National anthem compositions in E-flat major
1893 songs